The Portland Alley Sweeper, also called the Alley Sweeper Urban Enduro, is a motorcycle rally in the city alleys of Portland, Oregon. Begun in 2009 by Zac Christensen of the  Sang Froid Riding Club motorcycle club in Portland, the rally has been described as "a cross-city tour of Portland’s mangled side streets by way of whatever two-wheeled contraption you can hobble together", drawing around 300 riders a year.

Event organizers say by riding street legal two-wheeled vehicles in the city's alleys, they are merely exercising their rights on a public right of way and said that it is "not a race but a parade". Opponents say they are concerned about child safety and some even say they are "hostage in their own yard" for the duration of the hours-long rally. One resident said that the mostly small-displacement dual-sport motorcycles and scooters "sound like tanks".

Portland police have said the rally riders are permitted in the alleys if they are obeying the  speed limit, and other traffic laws.

Notes

References

External links

Portland neighbors decry alley dirt bike rally (VIDEO), KGW, July 26, 2014

Motorcycle rallies in the United States
Alley Sweeper
Alley Sweeper
2009 establishments in Oregon